The United Nations Statistical Commission (StatCom) is a Functional Commission of the United Nations Economic and Social Council, established in 1947. The Statistical Commission oversees the work of the United Nations Statistics Division (UNSD). Its 24 member states are elected by the Economic and Social Council on the basis of the following geographical distribution: African states (5), Asian States (4), Eastern European States (4), Latin American and Caribbean States (4), Western European and other States (7). Since July 1999 the Commission meets every year. As set forth by the Economic and Social Council, in the terms of reference, the Commission shall assist the Council:
"In promoting the development of national statistics and the improvement of their comparability;"
"In the coordination of the statistical work of specialized agencies;"
"In the development of the central statistical services of the Secretariat;"
"In advising the organs of the United Nations on general questions relating to the collection, analysis and dissemination of statistical information;"
"In promoting the improvement of statistics and statistical methods generally."

One of the best known subunits of the Statistics Division is the United Nations Group of Experts on Geographical Names (UNGEGN), also known as the United Nations Conference on the Standardization of Geographical Names (UNCSGN). This unit attempts to standardize the names of locations across languages, alphabets, and cultures.

The sixth UN Conference on the Standardization of Geographical Names was in 1992 (New York), the seventh in 1998 (New York), the eighth in 2002 (Berlin), and the ninth in 2007 (New York). One issue addressed at these conferences was the Sea of Japan naming dispute.

The Bureau
The officers are the Chairman, 3 Vice-chairmen and the Rapporteur, elected for a one-year period by the members of the Commission at the beginning of a session. Since 1999, its role is more of a steering one; the Chairman may seek for complementary assistance from other members (Friends of the Chair).

Chairmanship
{| class="wikitable"
! width=100 | 
! width=100 | 
! width=150 | 
! wdith=200 | 
|-
| 2020
| 51st
| 
| Shigeru Kawasaki
|-
| 2019
| 50th
| 
| Zachary Mwangi
|-
| 2018
| 49th
| 
| Zachary Mwangi
|-
| 2017
| 48th
| 
| Wasmália Bivar
|-
| 2016
| 47th
| 
| Wasmália Bivar
|-
| 2015
| 46th
| 
| John Pullinger
|-
| 2014
| 45th 
| 
| Jil Matheson
|-
| 2013
| 44th 
|  
| Gabriella Vukovich
|-
| 2012
| 43rd 
|  
| Gabriella Vukovich
|-
| 2011 
| 42nd
| 
| Ali Bin Mahboob
|-
| 2010 
| 41st
| 
| Ali Bin Mahboob
|-
| 2009 
| 40th 
| 
| Pali Lehohla
|-
| 2008 
| 39th 
| 
| Pali Lehohla
|-
| 2007 
| 38th 
| 
| Gilberto Calvillo Vives
|-
| 2006 
| 37th 
|  
| Gilberto Calvillo Vives
|-
| 2005 
| 36th
| 
| Katherine Wallman
|-
| 2004 
| 35th
| 
| Katherine Wallman
|-
| 2003 
| 34th 
| 
| Tamás Mellár
|-
| 2002 
| 33rd
|  
| Tamás Mellár
|-
| 2001 
| 32nd
| 
| Shigeru Kawasaki
|-
| 2000 
| 31st
|  
| Guest Charumbira
|-
| 1999 
| 30th
|  
| Guest Charumbira
|-
| 1997 
| 29th
|  
| Carlos Jarque
|-
| 1995 
| 28th
| 
| Bill Mclennan
|-
| 1994
| Special session 
|  
| Jozef Olenski
|-
| 1993 
| 27th
|  
| Willem Begeer
|-
| 1991 
| 26th
|  
| Willem Begeer
|-
| 1989 
| 25th
|  
| Luis Alberto Beccaria
|-
| 1987 
| 24th
|  
| Emmanuel Oti Boateng
|-
| 1985 
| 23rd
| 
| Tom Linehan
|-
| 1983 
| 22nd
| 
| Vera Nyitrai
|-
| 1981 
| 21st
|  
| Joseph W. Duncan
|-
| 1979 
| 20th
|  
| Mikhail Antonovich Korolev
|-
| 1976 
| 19th
| 
| V. R. Rao
|-
| 1974 
| 18th
|  
| Claus Moser
|-
| 1972 
| 17th
|  
| Jean Ripert
|-
| 1970 
| 16th
|  
| Jean Ripert
|-
| 1968 
| 15th
|  
| Keith Archer
|-
| 1966 
| 14th
| 
| Petter Jakob Bjerve
|-
| 1965 
| 13th
| 
| Petter Jakob Bjerve
|-
| 1962 
| 12th
| 
| Donal McCarthy
|-
| 1960 
| 11th
| 
| Donal McCarthy
|-
| 1958 
| 10th
|  
| George Wood
|-
| 1956 
| 9th
|  
| P.C. Mahalanobis
|-
| 1954 
| 8th
|  
| P.C. Mahalanobis
|-
| 1953 
| 7th
|  
| Harry Campion
|-
| 1951 
| 6th
|  
| Harry Campion
|-
| 1950 
| 5th
|  
| Philip Idenburg
|-
| 1949 
| 4th
| 
| Philip Idenburg
|-
| 1948 
| 3rd
| 
| Herbert Marshall
|-
| 1947 (August) 
| 2nd
| 
| Herbert Marshall
|-
| 1947 (January) 
| 1st
| 
| Herbert Marshall
|-
| 1946 
| Nuclear session 
| 
| Stuart A. Rice
|-
|}

See also

Committee for the Coordination of Statistical Activities
List of national and international statistical services
United Nations Statistics Division
Voorburg group
World Statistics Day

References

Further reading
Hausner, Isolde: Die „United Nations Group of Experts on Geographical Names“ (UNGEGN) und die Standardisierung geographischer Namen. In: Kainz, W. / Kriz, K. / Riedl, A. (eds.): Aspekte der Kartographie im Wandel. Festschrift für Ingrid Kretschmer zum 65. Geburtstag. Wien 2004 (= Wiener Schriften zur Geographie und Kartographie).
Kerfoot, Helen: Role of the United Nations in the standardization of geographical names: some fifty years on. In: United Nations, Department of Economic and Social Affairs, Statistics Division (ed.): Manual for the standardization of geographical names. United Nations Group of Experts on Geographical Names. New York 2006: 83-97.

External links
 
 Home page for Statistical Division
 Official home page for UNGEGN
 Website for UNGEGN Working Group on Romanization Systems

Statistical organizations
United Nations Economic and Social Council
United Nations Secretariat